PewPew may refer to:

 PewPew (video game), a 2009 game by French developer Jean-François Geyelin
 PewPew (streamer), Vietnamese online streamer